"Hot Like Fire" is a song recorded by American singer Aaliyah for her second studio album One in a Million (1996). The song was written by both Missy Elliot and Timbaland, with the latter producing the song. Musically, the album version is a Trip hop song, while the single remix version is a "jeep-friendly" funk song with a bouncing beat and features ad-libs from Timbaland. Lyrically, the song is sexually suggestive, with Aaliyah promising that she is worth the wait. The song was re-recorded and released as the fifth and final single from One in a Million with "The One I Gave My Heart To" on September 16, 1997 by Blackground Records and Atlantic Records.

Upon its release, the song was met with generally positive reviews from critics, with many praising both Aaliyah's vocal delivery and the song's production. In the United States, "Hot Like Fire" barely charted on any of the major Billboard charts, being largely overshadowed by its A-side "The One I Gave My Heart To"; it peaked at number 31 on the US R&B/Hip-Hop Airplay chart. Internationally, the song peaked at number 30 on the UK Singles Chart.

Music and lyrics
"Hot like Fire" was described as "sleek" "fine Trip hop" and  it is a "panting minimalist controlled-blaze baby-maker" with suggestive lyrics. The production on the song's 1997 single release differs from the album version and it has a "more jeep-friendly beat". According to Emily Manning from i-D, the songs remix "features a sizzling, soulful, and bouncing beat (plus an ad-lib Tim ripped from Suzanne Vega's "Tom's Diner")". Billboard further discussed the remix saying, "Timb’s club-ready remix, which jacks up the bounce of the original track, layers on a dose of funk and essentially sets the whole thing ablaze".

On "Hot Like Fire", Aaliyah "hums and moans promises to her new bae that his patience will be rewarded". Delivering the lines "I know you've been wait, you've been waitin a long time for me/But if you wait a little while longer, this is how it'll be", Aaliyah promises to be "hot and ready for her patient lover on this enticing opening offering".
According to Bob Waliszewski's review on the website Focus on the Family, the song "celebrates passionate sex-without suggesting a marital context".

Critical reception
Shannon Marcec from Complex felt that the re-recorded remix version of "Hot Like Fire" was better than the original version, stating: "No shade to the original version of "Hot Like Fire," but the "Timbaland's Groove Mix" was 10 times better". Marcec also praised both the song's production and Aaliyah's vocals, saying: "Timbaland presents another entrancing track, beatboxing Susanne Vega's "Tom's Diner," while Aaliyah brings her melodic voice and habitually sexy style". Bianca Gracie from Fuse also felt the remix was better than the original version, also saying that Timbaland "added his magic hip-hop-infused touch to the steamy track, which was anchored by Aaliyah's laidback vocals". Bob Waliszewski of Plugged In, a publication of the Christian conservative organization Focus on the Family, was less enthusiastic in his review of One in a Million, writing that the sexually suggestive lyrics of "Hot Like Fire" "spoil whatever good this disc has going for it".

Commercial performance 
Released simultaneously with "The One I Gave My Heart To", "Hot Like Fire" didn't chart on any of the major Billboard charts–with the exception of the US R&B/Hip-Hop Airplay chart, where it peaked at number 31 on August 16, 1997.

Internationally, the song performed moderately, peaking at number 30 on the UK Singles Chart on November 22, 1997. The song also peaked at number 25 on the UK Dance Chart on November 16, 1997, and at number three on the UK R&B Chart on November 23, 1997.

Music video

Synopsis
The accompanying music video for "Hot Like Fire" was directed by Lance "Un" Rivera, while Fatima Robinson directed the choreography. Missy Elliott, Timbaland, Magoo, Playa, Changing Faces, Lil' Kim, and Junior M.A.F.I.A. made cameos in the video. Timbaland's Groove Mix was used for the video rather than the album version of the song. The video starts with a large number of people in an urban neighborhood on a very hot summer day. Aaliyah drives a red car with a fire engine. The setting quickly changes to night as Aaliyah gets out of the car to perform the chorus on a steamy stage with sparks in the background. During the second verse, Aaliyah is seen dancing with the crowd. Aaliyah returns to the stage with the dancers to perform the chorus again. Timbaland and Elliott perform their verses.

Fashion
For the video, Aaliyah wore red camo cargo pants that were custom-made by 5001 Flavors. According to her former stylist Derek Lee "Her look was really supposed to be about the pants and her swag, so the top needed to be very, very simple". He continued saying, "She has Jamaican blood and I've always been a fan of dancehall music, so you see her rocking two different colored Clark Wallabees, because Wallabees were huge in dancehall. I always wanted to pull that into it."

Reception
The music video for "Hot Like Fire" made its television debut on BET during the week ending August 17, 1997. On August 24, 1997, the video debuted on other cable network channels, such as MTV and The Box. The video became the eighth most-played video on BET during the week of September 21, 1997. Emily Manning from i-D felt that the music video was "underappreciated" considering the video's star-studded cameos; she also mentioned that the video "features peak Aaliyah street style: rose-tinted shades and baggy camo cargos". Tatiana Cirisano from Billboard, felt the music video pulled the song together and that
"the whole crew — Missy, Aaliyah and Timb — pull up in a firetruck, inciting a bumping block party full of both literal and metaphorical flames".

Live performances
In August 1997, Aaliyah made a televised appearance on the short-lived talk show Vibe, where she performed "Hot Like Fire" and gave the show's host a gift basket full of promotional items.

Legacy 
In 2013, American R&B singer Solange and British indie pop group The xx covered "Hot Like Fire" at the Coachella Valley Music and Arts Festival. Bassier Oliver Sim sang the first verse of the song while his fellow group member Romy Madley Croft backed him in the performance. Solange came out during the performance in a "bright white tank top and fluorescent pink skirt" to join The xx. Jeff Benjamin from Fuse praised the performance, saying: "Solange's sweet vocals sounded right at home on The xx-ified version of Aaliyah's track. And it was so clear Solange was having fun as she danced around on stage, giggling into the mic and flailed her arms about". Their cover of the song was a nod to the group's modern R&B roots that are infused in their "stripped down sound". In 2016, rapper Nicki Minaj interpolated "Hot Like Fire" in her song "Black Barbies" with the "oh no, no, no, no" line.

Track listings and formats

US cassette and CD singles
"The One I Gave My Heart To" (radio edit) – 3:53
"Hot Like Fire" (album version) – 4:22

US 12-inch vinyl and maxi CD single
"The One I Gave My Heart To" (radio edit) – 3:53
"Hot Like Fire" (album version) – 4:22
"Hot Like Fire" (Timbaland's Groove Mix) (featuring Timbaland) – 4:35
"Hot Like Fire" (Feel My Horns Mix) – 4:35
"Hot Like Fire" (instrumental) – 4:19
"Death of a Playa" (featuring Rashad Haughton) – 4:53

European maxi CD single
"The One I Gave My Heart To" (radio edit) – 3:53
"Hot Like Fire" (Timbaland's Groove Mix) (featuring Timbaland) – 4:35
"Hot Like Fire" (Feel My Horns Mix) – 4:35

European cassette single
"The One I Gave My Heart To" (radio edit) – 3:53
"Hot Like Fire" (Timbaland's Groove Mix) (featuring Timbaland) – 4:35

UK 12-inch vinyl
"The One I Gave My Heart To" (radio edit) – 3:53
"Hot Like Fire" (Timbaland's Groove Mix) (featuring Timbaland) – 4:35
"Hot Like Fire" (Feel My Horns Mix) – 4:35
"Hot Like Fire" (instrumental) – 4:19

Charts

Release history

Notes

References

External links
 

1997 singles
Aaliyah songs
Song recordings produced by Timbaland
Songs written by Missy Elliott
Songs written by Timbaland
1996 songs
Blackground Records singles
Trip hop songs